The Harrison Loring House is a historic house at 789 East Broadway in the South Boston neighborhood of Boston, Massachusetts.  It is a -story brick mansion, with a mansard roof in the Second Empire style.  It has brownstone trim around the windows, a modillioned cornice, and a projecting center section with its entrance sheltered by a shallow portico.  It was built in 1865 for Harrison Loring, owner of the City Point Iron Works, a major South Boston shipyard, at which steamships were built in the late 19th century.  Loring lived in this house until 1894.

The house was listed on the National Register of Historic Places in 1983 and designated as a Boston Landmark by the Boston Landmarks Commission in 1984

See also
National Register of Historic Places listings in southern Boston, Massachusetts

References

External links

 City of Boston, Landmarks Commission. Harrison Loring House, 1981

Houses in Boston
National Register of Historic Places in Boston
Landmarks in South Boston
Houses on the National Register of Historic Places in Suffolk County, Massachusetts
Houses completed in 1865
Second Empire architecture in Massachusetts